Leucopogon blepharolepis is a species of flowering plant in the heath family Ericaceae and is endemic to the south-west of Western Australia.

It was first formally described in 1868 by George Bentham in Flora Australiensis. The specific epithet (blepharolepis) means "eye-lash scale", referring to scales near the ovary. 

This leucopogon occurs in the Esperance plains, Jarrah Forest and Mallee bioregions of the south-west of Western Australia and is listed as "Priority Four" by the Government of Western Australia Department of Biodiversity, Conservation and Attractions, meaning that it is rare or near threatened.

References

blepharolepis
Ericales of Australia
Flora of Western Australia
Plants described in 1868
Taxa named by George Bentham